Ariunsanaagiin Enkhtuul (Mongolian: Ариунсанаагийн Энхтуул, born January 14, 1996) is a cross-country skier from Mongolia. She was a participant in the 2022 Winter Olympics in the women's 10 kilometer, and the qualification for the women's sprint. Her best finish in both events was in the qualification where she placed 79th out of 91 competitors.

Results 
Ariunsanaa has competed in the women's 10 kilometer and the qualification for the women's sprint. In the qualification sprint, she was 79th of 91 competitors with a time of 3 minutes and 58.25 seconds, while 1st place was won by Jonna Sundling of Sweden with a time of 3 minutes and 9.03 seconds. In the 10 kilometer, she was 85h of 98 competitors with a time of 37 minutes and 2.5 seconds, while the gold was won by Theresa Johaug of Norway.

Olympic Games

Qualification

References

Year of birth missing (living people)
Living people
Place of birth missing (living people)
Mongolian female cross-country skiers
Cross-country skiers at the 2022 Winter Olympics
Olympic cross-country skiers of Mongolia

External Links 

 Enkhtuul Ariunsanaa at Olympics.com

 Enkhtuul Ariunsanaa at Olympedia